The Amazing Spiez! is an animated television series created and developed by David Michel and Vincent Chalvon-Demersay. It was co-produced by Marathon Media, Image Entertainment Corporation, and Canal J. The series is a spin-off of Totally Spies!, another series from Marathon Media. In France, the series debuted on TF1 on April 1, 2009. Its final episode was broadcast on May 25, 2012.

The series follows four siblings: Lee, Marc, Megan, and Tony, who have been chosen by the WOOHP (World Organization Of Human Protection) to become international spies. Together, the spies learn to juggle everyday life with their missions.

Episodes

Characters 
 Lee Clark (voiced by Andrew Sabiston) is the oldest at age 13 (later 14) and considered the strongest one. He is very athletic and the most powerful spy in the group. While his two brothers share funny and immature traits, Lee is one part big brother and one part father figure, and in his eyes, nothing is more important than his siblings. His spy suit and his MPCom are red. He is also the jet pilot and is often shown to be claustrophobic. In addition, he has a habit of going crazy over girls, which is similar to Clover's boy-craziness. In his normal appearance, Lee has auburn colored hair in the style of a flat top, pale blue eyes, and light skin. He wears a red short sleeved shirt with a white "W" on it, burgundy pants, red and white shoes, and a red and white wrist band.
 Marc Clark (voiced by Peter Cugno) is the smartest one in the group at age 12 (later 13). Much like Sam, his intelligence is sometimes considered freaky by his siblings, as shown in Operation WOOCSI. He calls himself the 'Family Geek'. He has the knowledge of every single subject known to man, but 'like most geeks' cannot get a date. His spy suit and his MPCom are blue. Sometimes he switches places with Lee or Megan as the jet pilot. In his normal appearance, Marc has short light brown hair, hazel eyes and light skin. He wears a short sleeved blue two-toned hoodie with a white long sleeved shirt under it, dark green cargo pants, and blue and white shoes. He and Lee are the only two siblings that look like their mom - with the hair and skin tone.
 Megan Clark (voiced by Alyson Court) is an optimistic and high energy 12-year-old girl (later 13) who is Marc's fraternal twin sister. She always hangs out with her brothers and usually cracks up at jokes that are not funny at all. She is big on saving the environment and is trying to find ways to reduce her family's carbon footprint. She is often reminded by her brothers that she is 'just a girl', but this pushes her to be even more competitive. Her spy suit and MPCom are pink. She sometimes switches places with Lee as the jet pilot. Megan is almost the spitting image of Alex from the original series, 'Totally Spies!'. In her normal appearance, Megan has black hair swept up in the back (almost like Alex's), green eyes and dark skin. She wears a short-sleeved pink zip-up hoodie with purple sleeves that reveals her midriff, a pink skirt with white leggings, and pink and white shoes with fuchsia pink pom-poms on them. Her dark skin is probably from her aunt Trudy who is seen with a dark complexion and hair color from her father.
 Tony Clark (voiced by Julie Lemieux) is the youngest sibling of the Clark family who is 11 (later 12) years old. He is a no-nonsense go-getter and very hyperactive boy. He is impatient and prefers to act before even thinking, which sometimes leads the spies into deep trouble. His spy suit and MPCom are yellow and the Freezdiscs seem to be his favorite gadget. He shares a room with Marc. In his normal appearance, Tony, like Megan, has black hair that is swept up one way and down the other and also has green eyes and dark skin. He wears a long sleeved yellow shirt under a blue jacket, blue pants, yellow and white shoes, and a grey belt. He and Megan are the only ones to look like Alex from Totally Spies! and to look like their dad - skin tone and hair style.
 Jerry (voiced by Adrian Truss) is the founder and administrator of WOOHP (World Organization of Human Protection). He is a middle-aged, and very serious British gentleman. He briefs the Spiez on their missions, distributes their gadgets, and provides mission support with information or direct involvement. He is often the butt of jokes when it comes to his absence of a full head of hair and his age.
 Tami (voiced by Sugar Lyn Beard) is a popular 13-year-old (later 14) girl in the Spiez' school. She's a rival to the Spiez. They, particularly Megan, find her annoying and greatly dislike her for being spoiled and snobby all the time. She is somewhat like Mandy from Totally Spies! although not as malicious. In "Operation: Scary Jerry Part 2," an anesmatic Jerry mistakes her for his daughter and she ends up assisting him, Terry, and Sherry in their plot. Luckily, her memory was erased at the end of the episode. She is the only character that wears more than one outfit in the whole show, aside from Megan in some episodes.
 Coline, Danielle and Jacqueline: Coline, Danielle and Jacqueline were Tami's three best friends. They are also rivals to Tony, Marc, and Lee.
 Cal Clark (voiced by Dan Petronijevic) is the husband of Karen and the father of the Spiez. He is a former OOPSIE agent who beat Alpha and Omega (episode 22-24) with his partner and now wife, Karen. He has no idea his children are WOOHP agents. He owns a sports store and has a very healthy way of life. As the head of the Clark family, Cal wishes to instill his kids to follow a certain kind of discipline.
 Karen Clark (voiced by Liz Ramos) is the wife of Cal, the younger sister of Aunt Trudy, and the mother of the Spiez.  Karen is a former OOPSIE agent who, like her husband, has no idea her children are WOOHP agents.
 Sam, Alex, Clover, Britney, Blaine, and Dean appear on occasion.
 Some of the villains from Totally Spies! particularly from the fifth season, have appeared.

Broadcast 
The Amazing Spiez was broadcast on Cartoon Network in the United States. It was also aired on MBC 3 in the Arab World and Discovery Kids in India. As of April 16, 2022, the series started to become available on the official Totally Spies! YouTube channel, with new episodes being uploaded on Saturdays. The show also has its own YouTube channel, established in 2013, which mostly uploads highlights from various episodes.

Notes

References

External links 
 SpieZ! Nouvelle Génération at Gulli.fr
 

Totally Spies!
Espionage television series
Fiction about mind control
2009 French television series debuts
2012 French television series endings
2009 Canadian television series debuts
2012 Canadian television series endings
Teletoon original programming
TF1 original programming
Television series by Image Entertainment Corporation
2000s French animated television series
2010s French animated television series
2000s Canadian animated television series
2010s Canadian animated television series
Canadian children's animated action television series
Canadian children's animated adventure television series
Canadian children's animated comedy television series
French children's animated action television series
French children's animated adventure television series
French children's animated comedy television series
Anime-influenced Western animated television series
Canadian animated television spin-offs
French animated television spin-offs
English-language television shows
French-language television shows
Teen animated television series
Television shows set in Paris
Television shows filmed in Paris
Television shows set in Miami
Television shows filmed in Miami